Subhadra Adhikari (1947/1948 - 2019) was a Nepali actress of film, stage and television. She was also a singer. In a career spanning six decades, she acted in more than a hundred feature films, and dozens of stage plays and television soap operas. Her debut film was Manko Bandh. Other notable films include Chino, Kanyadan, Basudev, Basanti, Muna Madan, Swarga, Saubhagya and Bato Muniko Phool, among others. She was awarded the Chalachitra Dhirgha Sadhana Samman (with cash prize Rs 351,111) by President Bidya Devi Bhandari for her work in film.

References

Nepalese film actresses
Nepalese stage actresses
Nepalese television actresses
Actresses in Nepali cinema
Actresses in Nepali television
20th-century Nepalese actresses